Cave Mountain is located on the border of Alberta and British Columbia on the Continental Divide. It was named in 1916 by the International Boundary Survey. A cave within the mountain accounts for the name.

See also
List of peaks on the Alberta–British Columbia border
Mountains of Alberta
Mountains of British Columbia

References

Cave Mountain
Cave Mountain
Canadian Rockies